William Woods was a former football (soccer) player who represented New Zealand at international level.

Woods made his full All Whites debut in a 5–6 loss to South Africa on 28 June 1947 and ended his international playing career with three A-international caps to his credit, his final cap an appearance in a 1–4 loss to South Africa on 17 July 1947.

References 

Year of birth missing (living people)
Possibly living people
New Zealand association footballers
New Zealand international footballers
20th-century New Zealand people

Association footballers not categorized by position